B56 or B-56 may refer to:
 Bundesstraße 56, a German road
 HLA-B56, an HLA-B serotype
 Boeing B-56, an aircraft